Armando Colaço (born 22 June 1953) is an Indian football coach, who last managed East Bengal FC in the I-League. He is the most successful manager in the history of another I-League club Dempo, in terms of trophies in the last 20 years and is also the club's longest-serving manager. Heavily influenced by Ukrainian manager Valeriy Lobanovskyi, Colaco is the first I-League coach to guide an Indian team into the semi-finals of the AFC Cup, which he did in 2008. Colaco is widely regarded as one of India's best managers after the success he has enjoyed at Churchill Brothers and Dempo.

Early life
Colaco was born on 22 June 1953 in Panjim to parents – Vincent Salvador Colaço and Clarina Dias Colaço. Having lost his father at a very young age, but never gave up on his ambitions of playing football, which he did right from a young age during his schooling at Don Boscos where Fr Joseph Casti and Fr Thomas, in particular, encouraged the footballer in the youthful Armando.
According to Armando, it was Sir Edwin, Domnic, Wilson Paes, along with Fr Simon, Fr Edward and Fr Benedict who played an important role in his life as far as his early upbringing was concerned. Later in his life, his wife Juliana and daughter Genevieve have been his motivation and support.

Playing career

First-team career
After gaining the necessary exposure with Don Bosco and Panjim Gymkhana, Armando, who was at the end of his teens, took a career-shaping step in the 1970–71 season when he was chosen to play for Dempo for the first time, under coach Joseph Ratnam, who taught his wards how to play football with discipline. "That was a very important phase of my career as far as shaping the destiny of my football talent was concerned as I got picked for a big club – Dempo," Armando reminisced. Though he made Dempo his abode for the next 14 years to come, as a player, the hardworking Armando plied his trade with dedication and commitment before he hung his boots in 1985.

Managerial career

Early coaching
A recipient of the State Kerkar award, Armando, had to look beyond his retirement as a player and it were two men – Alberto Colaço, the present AIFF secretary, and Agnelo Mascarenhas, who encouraged the just-retired Dempo player to move into football coaching. And thus began a new journey for Armando the coach. From 1985-88, the Curtorim-based trainer, essayed himself into coaching Salcete Football Club and soon guided the club to a win in Stafford Cup. Soon, Armando had a one-year offer from Sesa Goa, which he accepted with delight and during the 1988–89 season, the team won the Vitthal Trophy under his guidance. That actually set the tone for his coaching stints elsewhere as Armando, who was fast gathering moss, rolled on like a stone, and successfully coached the state U-21 Santosh team partnering Peter Vales and also Goa U-23 team at the BC Roy Trophy in the early 90s. That was after a year-long stint with Dempo S.C. (1989–90) where he won the Pomes Cup and Scissors Cup.

Churchill Brothers
His success was noted as Churchill Brothers S.C. offered him the role of a coach first and then the Technical Director when Danny Maclaren was roped in as a coach during the 1994-2000 period. Switching his base from Dempo to Churchill in the 90s, Armando had announced his arrival as a seasoned coach with three Goa Football League titles and an NFL runner-up trophy with Churchill Brothers and also a foray into the AFC Cup.

Dempo
In 2000, came a Clarion call from Mr Shrinivas V Dempo, offering Armando to coach his team, which had hit a trough in the National Football League following a demotion. Having agreed to accept the challenge, Armando greeted the opportunity to redefine the destiny of a football club, which under his patronage has risen from the dust to virtually touch the skies.

Under Colaço, Dempos have managed to inscribe their name on four national league titles, Durand Cup, Federation Cup and he also managed Dempo to have been the first Indian club to reach the semi-finals of the AFC Cup, in 2008. Also he won Dempo three I-League titles in 2007–08 and 2009–10 and 2011–12. After the 2012–13 season where Dempo finished in 5th place, they parted ways with  Armando Colaco with whom they had won 5 League titles.

India

On 17 May 2011, Colaço in an interview said that he had accepted the job to coach the Indian football team. The All India Football Federation confirmed the appointment after an Executive Committee meeting on 20 May. On 10 July 2011, Colaço managed his first India match against Maldives, the match ended 1–1. On 17 July 2011, Colaco won his first game as manager of India against Qatar 2–1 in a friendly. On 23 July 2011, Colaço suffered his first defeat, 0–3, at the hands of the UAE during a 2014 FIFA World Cup qualification match at Sheikh Khalifa International stadium, Al Ain City. In the return leg on 28 July 2011 in Ambedkar Stadium, Delhi Colaço managed to get India a 2–2 draw but could not stop India from falling 5–2 on aggregate. He was removed from his post shortly, and replaced by Savio Medeira in October 2011.

East Bengal
On 14 November 2013, East Bengal appointed Armando Colaco as their new head coach. On 15 May 2014, it was confirmed that Colaco would continue coaching the club for another year.

Despite being given the chance to coach the team for the entire 2014–15 campaign, it was announced that Colaco had been sacked by East Bengal on 18 February 2015.

Later years
Since parting ways with East Bengal in 2015, Colaco had spells at Bardez FC, Sesa FA and more-recently with Churchill Brothers in the Goa Professional League. In August 2022, Colaco was appointed as new head coach of another Goa-based side Sporting Clube de Goa on a three-year deal.

Tactics
Colaco has been widely praised for his tactical prowess and match reading abilities. He is regarded as one of the first coaches in India to have brought the possession style football in the country. In his time at dempo, he employed a 4-4-2 formation, having Climax Lawrence as a defensive midfield; Clifford Miranda, Joaquim Abranches, Anthony Pereira or Nicolau Borges as wide midfielders with Brazilian Beto as supporting striker behind Ranti Martins, the main striker. Characteristics of that team was that they played with short passes along with sudden burst of wing play. This strategy helped Dempo to reach the semi finals of the 2008 AFC Cup, although losing to Al-Safa' SC of Lebanon in the semi-finals.

Statistics

Honours

Managerial
Salcete
Stafford Cup: 1987
SESA Goa
Vitthal Trophy: 1988–89

Dempo
 National Football League: 2004–05, 2006–07; runners-up: 2003–04
 I-League: 2007–08, 2009–10, 2011–12; third place: 2010–11
National Football League II: 2001–02
 I-League 2nd Division: 2015–16
 Goa Professional League: 2005, 2007, 2009, 2010, 2011; runners-up: 2006–07
 Federation Cup: 2004;<ref name=aiff>Federation Cup. the-aiff.com. All India Football Federation. (archived).</ref> runners-up: 2001, 2008, 2012
 Indian Super Cup: 2008, 2010; runners-up: 2005, 2007, 2009
 Durand Cup: 2006

Individual
 FPAI Syed Abdul Rahim Award: 2009–10

See also
 Goans in football
 History of Indian football
 List of India national football team managers

References

Bibliography

Chattopadhyay, Hariprasad (2017). Mohun Bagan–East Bengal'' . Kolkata: Parul Prakashan.

External links

 Armando Colaco at PlayemkerStats

1953 births
Living people
Indian football managers
I-League managers
Dempo SC managers
Churchill Brothers FC Goa managers
East Bengal Club managers
Dempo SC players
India national football team managers
Association footballers not categorized by position
Indian footballers
Footballers from Goa